Bianna (Βίαννα) was a young unmarried woman from Biennus (modern Viannos) in Crete, according to Stephanus of Byzantium. After a famine forced a mass emigration, she was among those who fled to an area of Gaul along the river Rhône. During a dance, a chasm opened up in the earth and engulfed her. 

According to a legend, their companions gave her name to a place, Vienna, which became the capital of the Celtic Allobroges (Vienne in the Dauphiné).

See also
Greeks in pre-Roman Gaul

Sources
Pierre Grimal, Classical Mythology (Blackwell, 1996, from the original French edition of 1951), p. 76 online.
 Stephanus of Byzantium, De urbibus et populi (ed. Gronovius, p. pp. 166–167), citing Eusebius, Historia Ecclesiastica

Women in Greek mythology
Celtic women
Cretan mythology
Gaulish people
History of Grenoble
Heraklion (regional unit)
Allobroges
Ancient Greek women